is a Shinto shrine located on Mount Utatsu in Higashi-Mikage-machi, Kanazawa, Ishikawa Prefecture, Japan. Under the shrine ranking system, it was listed as a village shrine. Its annual festival day is May 2.

The shrine is dedicated to both Toyotomi Hideyoshi and Maeda Toshitsune, the  founder of Kaga Domain. It is located near two other shrines, Utatsu Shrine (a Tenman-gū) and Atago Shrine, and together they are known as the "Mount Utatsu Three Shrines".

History
Based on the dying wish of Maeda Toshiie, Maeda Toshitsune secretly enshrined a figure of Toyotomi Hideyoshi on the grounds of a Buddhist temple on Mount Utatsu in 1616. It became a village shrine in 1873. In 1887, the shrine was moved to the town of Tono (now Owari-chō in Kanazawa). The shrine was moved to its present location in 1908, when it was also renamed Toyokuni Shrine.

1616 establishments in Japan
Shinto shrines in Ishikawa Prefecture
Buildings and structures in Kanazawa, Ishikawa